Tudor Paraschiva (27 December 1919 – 15 May 1967) was a Romanian association football striker.

Club career
Tudor Paraschiva was born in Bucharest on 27 December 1919 and made his debut in Divizia A on 16 September 1939, playing for Unirea Tricolor București in a 3–2 loss against Rapid București. Under the guidance of player-coach Ștefan Cârjan he helped Unirea Tricolor win the Divizia A title in the 1940–41 season, contributing with two goals scored in 7 matches. In 1946, he went to play for Jiul Petroșani, a club where he would spend 10 seasons, scoring 66 goals in 208 Divizia A matches. Paraschiva ended his playing career at Minerul Lupeni, having a total of 238 Divizia A matches played and 71 goals scored.

After he ended his playing career, Paraschiva was coach at Minerul Vulcan and in 1962 he became the first coach of newly founded club, Pandurii Târgu Jiu.

International career
Tudor Paraschiva played 6 games and scored two goals at international level for Romania, making his debut on 11 May 1952 under coach Emerich Vogl in a friendly which ended with a 3–1 victory against Czechoslovakia in which he opened the score. His following appearance for the national team was also in a friendly, a 1–0 victory against Poland in which he scored the goal. His third game played for the national team was in a 2–1 loss against Hungary at the 1952 Summer Olympics in which he made a good impression, being selected by the Finnish authorities who organized the competition, to appear in a commemorative postage stamp. Paraschiva's last three games for the national team were a 3–1 victory in a friendly against East Germany, a 2–0 loss against Czechoslovakia at the 1954 World Cup qualifiers and a 5–1 loss against Hungary in a friendly.

International goals
Scores and results list Romania's goal tally first, score column indicates score after each Paraschiva goal.

Honours
Unirea Tricolor București
Divizia A: 1940–41
Cupa României runner-up: 1940–41

Notes

References

External links

1919 births
1967 deaths
Footballers from Bucharest
Romanian footballers
Romania international footballers
Olympic footballers of Romania
Footballers at the 1952 Summer Olympics
Romanian football managers
Liga I players
Liga II players
Unirea Tricolor București players
CS Minerul Lupeni players
CSM Jiul Petroșani players
CS Pandurii Târgu Jiu managers
Association football forwards